Edward Dean Price (February 12, 1919 – November 3, 1997) was a United States district judge of the United States District Court for the Eastern District of California.

Education and career

Born in Sanger, California, Price received an Artium Baccalaureus degree from the University of California, Berkeley in 1947 and a Bachelor of Laws from the UC Berkeley School of Law in 1949. He was in the United States Army during World War II, from 1942 to 1946. He was in private practice in Modesto, California from 1949 to 1979.

Federal judicial service

Price was nominated by President Jimmy Carter on November 1, 1979, to the United States District Court for the Eastern District of California, to a new seat created by 92 Stat. 1629. He was confirmed by the United States Senate on December 19, 1979, and received his commission on December 20, 1979. He assumed senior status on December 31, 1989. Price served in that capacity until his death on November 3, 1997.

References

Sources
 

1919 births
1997 deaths
Judges of the United States District Court for the Eastern District of California
United States district court judges appointed by Jimmy Carter
20th-century American judges
United States Army personnel of World War II
UC Berkeley School of Law alumni
People from Sanger, California
20th-century American lawyers